The 2008 World Short Track Speed Skating Team Championships was the 18th edition of the World Short Track Speed Skating Team Championships, which took place on 15-16 March 2008 in Harbin, China.

Teams were divided into two brackets of four: the best team from each bracket qualified directly for the final, while the two next teams entered for the repechage round and the last was eliminated. The best two teams in the repechage round qualified for the final. Thus, the final consisted of four teams. Each team was represented by four athletes at both 500 m and 1000 m as well as by two athletes at 3000 m. There were four heats at both 500 m and 1000 m, whereby each heat consisted of athletes representing different countries. There was one heat at 3000 m.

Medal winners

Results

Men

Women

External links
 Results I
 Results II
 Results book

World Short Track Speed Skating Team Championships
2008 World Short Track Speed Skating Team Championships
Sport in Harbin